Nicky Joyce is an inter-county Gaelic football player for Galway. He plays his club football with Killererin and was a member of the Galway senior team from 2003 to 2010 but returned in 2012.

Playing career

County
Joyce began playing for senior in early 2003 after being called up by former manager John O'Mahony to play alongside his cousin Pádraic Joyce. He has won the Connacht Senior Football Championship on three occasions in 2003, 2005 and 2008.

External links
 Official Galway GAA Website
 

Living people
1983 births
Galway inter-county Gaelic footballers
Killererin Gaelic footballers